Richard Leigh (born May 26, 1951 in Washington, D.C.) is an American country music songwriter and singer. He is best known for penning "Don't It Make My Brown Eyes Blue" (sung by Crystal Gayle). In 1978, he received a Grammy Award for "Best Country Song" for the popular song. It was nominated in both pop and country categories and reached number one on both charts.
 
His first number one song was "I'll Get Over You" (1976), also sung by Crystal Gayle. Other prominent singers who have brought his songs number one status over the years include Billy Dean, Mickey Gilley, Reba McEntire, Barbara Mandrell, Steve Wariner, and Don Williams. Kathy Mattea had another number one hit with "Come From the Heart" in 1990. In 1999, the Dixie Chicks recorded Leigh's "Cold Day in July" for their album Fly, reaching Number 10 on the country music charts in 2000.

Leigh was raised in Virginia, and lives in Tennessee. He is a graduate of Virginia Highlands Community College and Virginia Commonwealth University. It was while he was attending VCU that he penned and first sang "I'll Get Over You," while performing at the Crossroads Coffeehouse in Richmond, Virginia's Fan District. He has been nominated for songwriter of the year seven times and in 1994 he was inducted into the Nashville Songwriters Foundation Hall of Fame. On April 11, 2011, Leigh was one of only four chosen nationally from the American Community College System to be awarded 2011 AACC Outstanding Alumni Award for excellence in ones chosen field. Since 2013 he has arranged with VHCC to host the Richard Leigh Songwriter's Festival, an annual competition for new songwriting talent. Proceeds from the event go to VHCC's Great Expectations program benefiting foster care students.

List of number one songs
Number Ones on Billboard's US Country Music Chart unless otherwise noted.

AReached No. 1 on U.S. Radio & Records country singles charts.

Notes

External links
Online Home of Richard Leigh
Nashville Songwriters Foundation - Hall of Fame Profile
 Interview

1951 births
Living people
American country singer-songwriters
Grammy Award winners
American male singer-songwriters
Singer-songwriters from Washington, D.C.